Hawaii Preparatory Academy (also known as HPA) is a coeducational, private, day and international boarding school in Kamuela, Hawaii, providing K-12 education. The school has an annual day tuition at the Lower School (K-5) of $22,900, $25,300 at the Middle School (6-8), and $29,600 at the Upper School (9-12). Boarding tuition is $59,100 (domestic students) & $69,400 (international students) in 2021/22.

The school hosts many noteworthy science-related educational programs for the benefit of its students, such as Turtle Tagging with NOAA and The Energy Lab (a partnership with Stanford University). The school is also the host of the TED organization's TEDxYouth@HPA event. In addition, the school has a signature Capstone program for all students in grades 5, 8, and 12.

History 
Founded in 1949 by The Right Reverend Harry S. Kennedy, Episcopal Bishop of Honolulu, the school came of age under the leadership of James Monroe Taylor II, Headmaster from 1954 to 1974. Originally the school was located on the grounds of St. James Episcopal Church in Kamuela in buildings that were built as barracks for the United States Marines during World War II.

Currently the high school features four dormitories: Perry-Fiske Hall, Carter Hall, Robertson Hall, and Atherton House.

While the town is known as "Waimea", because there are multiple locations in Hawaii with that name, the term "Kamuela"  is used by the USPS to distinguish it from those other locations.

HPA is now divided into a lower school, middle school and upper school.  The lower and middle school together compose one campus in the Kohala region of the Big Island of Hawaii. The upper school is located at the foot of the Kohala Mountains while the lower and middle schools are located in the center of the town of Waimea.  The school is accredited by the National Association for Independent Schools (NAIS).

The upper campus has a weight room, wrestling room, pool, school library, an indoor tennis facility, baseball field, gym, bookstore, as well as a new (2008) softball field, a newly repaired football/soccer field and a new rubber track.  The school also is host to a cross country course. Along with classrooms, an art building,  and a theater, and an Energy Lab, the only of its kind in the world. The Davies Chapel, designed by Vladimir Ossipoff (as were most of the upper campus structures) was built in 1967. In 2015, the Chapel bell tower was taken down for restoration, an ongoing effort.

The village campus is in the middle of the town of Waimea, and features the only school-owned professional art-gallery in the state, Isaacs Art Center. Issacs' hosts a  large permanent collection of paintings, furniture, rare books, and Hawaiiana. The building that houses the Isaacs Art Center was built in 1915 as Waimea's first public school structure. The building received the prestigious 2003-2004 Historic Preservation Award from the Historic Hawai'i Foundation. In 2005, the building was named to the National Register of Historic Places.

The school colors are red and white. The school's mascot is Ka Makani. Ka Makani is the Hawaiian word for "the wind". (The campus is noteworthy for the steady winds which blow around it at speeds averaging 20 MPH)

The school's Energy Lab was designed by the Global, award-winning architectural planning and design firm Flansburgh Architects.

Noteworthy alumni
Angela Aki, Pop Singer and songwriter
Mark Andersen, Author, Community Activist
Ed Case, U.S. Representative
Steve Case, Entrepreneur, Venture capitalist, Founder/CEO of AOL.
Jovan Crnić, Serbian professional basketball player
Scott Eastwood, actor, model, son of Clint Eastwood 
Sky Feuer: PhD Biochemist, Academic Coordinator of UCSF's California Preterm Birth Initiative Program.
Jeff Hubbard, Bodyboarder, 2006 World Champion
James C. Kennedy, chairman and CEO of COX Enterprises
William C. Koch Jr., Tennessee Supreme Court Justice
Chad Kroski, novelist, playwright, and singer
Graham Salisbury, Award-winning Author and Screenwriter
Star Simpson, Entrepreneur
Stephen C. Stearns, Evolutionary Biologist and Professor, Yale University
Daniel Te'o-Nesheim, NFL defensive end
Max Unger, Second Round NFL Draft Pick
Peter Vitousek, Ecologist and Professor, Stanford University

Traditions 

 Olympics: A week-long competition between the four high-school classes, is one of the school's most cherished traditions. It is a bonding opportunity for the whole school that teaches teamwork, competition, rivalry, superiority, chants, cunning, and outright fun, filling students and teachers alike with school spirit.
The Big Water Slide: A massive water slide setup every Spring on the hillside of the HPA Upper Campus. 
The Fall Ball: A festive, Halloween-themed school dance held every year at the legendary Anna's Ranch.

Gallery

References

External links

See also
 Hualalai Academy

Private K-12 schools in Hawaii County, Hawaii
Boarding schools in Hawaii
1949 establishments in Hawaii
Educational institutions established in 1949
Preparatory schools in Hawaii